John Kingsmill (1 September 1920 – 6 August 2013) was an Australian author, actor and public speaker, and amateur social historian.  He was born in Sydney in 1920 and educated at Sydney Boys High School. He was on active service in World War II, after which he completed his accountancy studies and was in practice for some years. He achieved notice for his performance as Des Nolan (Gig) in Rusty Bugles, the controversial 1948 play by Sumner Locke Elliott. In 1955, he was a founding member of the Psychiatric Rehabilitation Association (Australia), and was its leader for several years, serving on its Board until 1984. During the 1970s he worked as a senior advertising copywriter at the George Patterson advertising agency Sydney office.

Bibliography
 No Hero: memoirs of a raw recruit in World War II, Hale and Iremonger, Sydney, 1994 
 Australia Street: a boy's eye view of the 1920s and 1930s, Hale & Iremonger, 1991 
 The Innocent: Growing up in Bondi in the 1920s and 1930s, Collins/Angus & Robertson, 1990 
 Sydney: The Harbour City, text John Kingsmill, paintings Jeff Rigby, Pierson & Co., 1988 
 My Brief Strut upon the Stage, Jacobyte Books, 2001 
 Dancing with the Patients: how PRA began, 2005 
 A Speaker Silenced, 2006 
 A Guide for Speechmakers, 2006

References

External links
Catalogue at the National Library of Australia

1920 births
Australian memoirists
2013 deaths
Writers from Sydney
People educated at Sydney Boys High School
Male actors from Sydney